Mapleton is a rural township in the Canadian province of Ontario, located within Wellington County.

Communities
The largest and central community in Mapleton is the village of Drayton, which contains the township offices and has the largest retail presence.

The township also contains the smaller communities of Alma, Bosworth, Dobbenville, Glen Allan, Goldstone, Hollen, Lebanon, Moorefield, Parker, Quarindale, Riverbank, Rothsay, Spruce Green, Stirton, Wyandot, and Yatton.

History
The township was formed by the amalgamation of the townships of Maryborough and Peel, and the village of Drayton on January 1, 1999.

Demographics 

Education
Mapleton is served by four public schools, administered by the Upper Grand District School Board. These are:
Alma Public School
Centre Peel Public School
Drayton Heights Public School
Maryborough Public School (Moorefield)

Secondary education is served by Norwell District Secondary School in Palmerston, in the adjacent township of Minto.

Mapleton is also served by one independent school
Community Christian School (Drayton), which is connected to the Ontario Alliance of Christian Schools.

Recreation

Conestogo Lake is home to a reservoir and conservation area. It is part of the Conestogo River watershed.

See also
List of townships in Ontario

References

External links

Lower-tier municipalities in Ontario
Municipalities in Wellington County, Ontario
Township municipalities in Ontario